Matteo Dionisi (born 22 July 1985) is an Italian professional footballer who plays as a centre back for  club Casertana.

Club career
Born in Rieti, Dionisi started his career in modest Serie D club Monterotondo, and then Rieti where he played for four seasons, winning the 2004–05 Serie D.

In 2007 he signed for Valenzana on Serie C2.

Between 2009 and 2012, he played in Serie D, and one season for Promozione club La Sabina. In 2014 he joined to Calcio Padova, and after won the promotion in 2014–15 Serie D, Dionisi made his professional Serie C debut for the club.

On 6 July 2018, he joined Latina Calcio.

In December 2018, he signed for Avellino.

On 1 July 2020, he moved to U.S. Savoia.

On 1 July 2020, he joined Serie D club Trento. On 6 July 2022, Dionisi moved to Casertana in Serie D.

References

External links
 
 
 

1987 births
Living people
People from Rieti
Footballers from Lazio
Italian footballers
Association football defenders
Serie C players
Serie D players
Promozione players
Valenzana Mado players
Rovigo Calcio players
A.S.D. Civitavecchia 1920 players
A.S.D. Sacilese Calcio players
Pordenone Calcio players
Calcio Padova players
Latina Calcio 1932 players
U.S. Avellino 1912 players
U.S. Savoia 1908 players
A.C. Trento 1921 players
Casertana F.C. players
Sportspeople from the Province of Rieti